Ola Kajbjer (born 28 March 1969) is a Swedish fencer. He competed in the foil events at the 1988 and 1992 Summer Olympics.

References

External links
 

1969 births
Living people
Swedish male foil fencers
Olympic fencers of Sweden
Fencers at the 1988 Summer Olympics
Fencers at the 1992 Summer Olympics
People from Burlöv Municipality
Sportspeople from Skåne County
20th-century Swedish people